Sjaak de Bruin (18 February 1903 – 26 January 1969) was a Dutch footballer. He played in three matches for the Netherlands national football team from 1929 to 1930.

References

External links
 

1903 births
1969 deaths
Dutch footballers
Netherlands international footballers
Footballers from Rotterdam
Association football defenders
SV SVV players